Trafficking kinesin-binding protein 2 is a protein that in humans is encoded by the TRAK2 gene.

Interactions 

TRAK2 has been shown to interact with Kir2.1 and GABRB2.

References

Further reading